Kostas Manoussakis (January 1929 – 26 August 2005) was a Greek film director and screenwriter. His 1964 film Treason was entered into the 1965 Cannes Film Festival and his 1966 film The Fear was entered into the 16th Berlin International Film Festival.

Selected filmography
 Treason (1964)
 The Fear (1966)

References

External links

1929 births
2005 deaths
Greek film directors
Greek screenwriters
20th-century screenwriters